The Silent Forest is a 2020 Taiwanese social psychological thriller drama film directed by Ko Chien-Nien. The film was inspired by a real-life sexual abuse scandal at National Tainan Special School, a Taiwanese school for the deaf. It was nominated for 8 Golden Horse Awards and won 2 awards, for Best New Performer and Best Sound Effects. The film released in Taiwan on October 15, 2020. The film will be exclusively released on HowPro+ and Disney+ Hotstar in Malaysia on June 1, 2021, and in Thailand on June 30, 2021.

Cast 
Troy Liu as Chang Chen
Buffy Chen as Yao Bei Bei
Liu Kuan-ting as Wang Ta-chun
Yang Kuei-mei as principal
 Kim Hyun-bin as Xiao Guang
 Jimmy Pan Chin-Yu as Yu Xiang
 Tai Bo as Bei Bei's grandpa 
 Chang Pen-yu as Zhang Cheng's mother
Vera Chen as the class instructor	
 Fan Ruixiu as Baodi
 Wang Shihao as Da Hungry
 Liao Junwei as Weihua
 Zheng Weiyi as little crooked
 Wang Jianmin as Teacher Weng
 Zeng Peiyu as Xiaoguang's mother
 Huang Shang-Ho as a police officer

Plot 
In the beginning scene, we see a teenage boy, Chang Cheng (played by Tzu-Chuan Liu) chasing an old man. Chang Cheng eventually catches up with the old man and starts to hit him right in front of some police officers. The officers pull the Chang Cheng off the old man. Officers cannot understand what the boy is trying to tell them, so they take him to the police station. The officers realize Chang Cheng is deaf and they aren't able to communicate with him. A teacher, Mr. Wang (played by Kuan-Ting Liu) from his new school for the hearing impaired shows up to the station and helps Chang Cheng communicate. Chang Cheng accuses the old man of stealing his wallet on the train, but the officers claim that the old man found the wallet and it was all a misunderstanding. Mr. Wang translates for Chang Cheng, but tells the officers that Chang Cheng is sorry for hitting the old man to get him out of trouble. Chang Cheng asks Mr. Wang if he believes him, and Mr. Wang responds that he tends to believe those who are deaf.

Mr. Wang takes Chang Cheng to his new school, where all the kids are playing and having fun together. Mr. Wang invites Chang Cheng to a school dance that night. Chang Cheng does not know anyone at school, so stands alone, but eventually he is pulled into the crowd to dance and starts to enjoy himself.

The next day, Chang Cheng is on the bus heading to school where he notices his classmate Bei Bei (played by Buffy Chen). He watches her talk and laugh with her friends, then sees that she is very interested in actors on stage. In the classroom, Chang Cheng continues to notice Bei Bei, he sees she is acting strange so he throws some paper at her and asks what she is doing. She tells him she is holding her breath and continues to do so. That night, Chang Cheng gets out of bed to find some wifi, but he notices some lights flashing in the bathroom. He slowly walks over to check, but then notices Bei Bei flashing a light at him from down below. She tells him to come out and takes him to the school swimming pool. Chang Cheng asks about the flashing lights in the bathroom, and Bei Bei responds that they are just playing. She is wearing a bathing suit under her shirt, and she jumps into the pool to avoid answering any more questions. Bei Bei wants to learn how to swim.

The next day on the bus, Chang Cheng is very content with his new life. He looks over to Bei Bei and sees that she is not in her seat. He looks for her and notices that there are sweaters hung up as a divider. He heads to the back to find a group of boys holding Bei Bei down and raping her. The leader of the group, Xiao Guang (played by Kim Hyeon-Bin) motioned to Chang Cheng to keep it a secret. The group continues to rape Bei Bei as she cries, they throw a sweater over her head. Chang Cheng watches in horror and eventually runs away from them. The bus chaperone notices what is going on, but stays silent. That night, his mom asks if Chang Cheng has made any new friends and if he likes his new school. Chang Cheng just nods his head.

The next day at school, Chang Cheng watches as Bei Bei plays soccer with the same group of boys that raped her. At night, Chang Cheng is pulled out of his bed by the group of boys and dragged to the bathroom. Xiao Guang tells Chang Cheng  that they should play together. The group of boys try to force Chang Cheng into the bathroom, but the alarm goes off and the boys scatter. Chang Cheng goes to the swimming pool with Bei Bei, where he asks her if she was the one to set off the alarm, why does she still play with those boys and why hasn't she told the teachers. Bei Bei tells Chang Cheng that he should stay silent or else they will bully him too. Bei Bei says the boys are nice to her most of the time, but she doesn't like it when they bully and rape her. She claims they are just playing though. Bei Bei tells Chang Cheng everything is fine and that he should just bully her with them, so he won't be alone.

The next day, Chang Cheng tells Mr. Wang what happened, then pulls Bei Bei off the bus and brings her to Mr. Wang. Bei Bei won't admit what happened at first, because she doesn't want to betray them. Bei Bei eventually is able to tell Mr. Wang the truth. She tells him that when they bully her, she screams for help and tells them to stop, but they just continue to do it.

Flashback to the past, we see Bei Bei very happy on the bus. Everyone is having fun and playing together. A classmate sits down next to her and they continue playing, but the boy begins to get aggressive and Bei Bei tries to push him away. But he gets even more aggressive and begins to sexually assault her. Another female student tries to help her, but the boys push her away. She goes to the teacher at the front of the bus to get help, but the teacher just waves her away. The boy rapes Bei Bei. She writes down what happened and tells her female teacher. The teacher gaslights her and claims that they boys are good kids and they would never hurt her, if they knew she didn't like what they were doing. Bei Bei looks defeated.

Back to the present, Mr. Wang confronts the principal about the situation, but the principal tries to gaslight Mr. Wang into staying silent. Mr. Wang says he is not the other teachers and he will not stay silent. In the following days, the principal and Mr. Wang interview all the students and find out that everyone has been a victim of rape, sexual assault, bullying, and more. All the students say that they are forced to bully/assault/rape others by Xiao Guang. During Xiao Guang's interview, they ask why he is doing it and he says he is just playing. Xiao Guang's parents are called in and he is scolded by them. Xiao Guang gets revenge by having a group of boys beat up Chang Cheng. Bei Bei's grandpa makes her stay home from school.

Chang Cheng meets up with Bei Bei to watch a movie. The theater double booked their seats, so the pair leaves when a couple claims their seats and makes a scene. On their way home, the pair sees a man being beaten in an alley. Bei Bei tells Chang Cheng she wants to go back to school, because she said she cannot survive in the outside world. Chang Cheng asks Mr. Wang to help convince Bei Bei's grandpa to allow her back to school, but her grandpa does not budge. The next day Chang Cheng tries to communicate with her grandpa through text on his phone, but he won't look. Chang Cheng loses his hearing aid when grandpa pushes him away, and since he cannot hear, Chang Cheng almost was hit by a shop owner's cart. The shop owner gets angry and yells at Chang Cheng. The grandpa pities Chang Cheng and helps him by apologizing and paying for the damage. The grandpa listens to Chang Cheng's explanation and allows Bei Bei back to school when Chang Cheng says he will protect her.

In the cafeteria the next day, Chang Cheng sits with Bei Bei and he notices Xiao Guang get upset after looking at his phone. Bei Bei is driven home by Mr. Wang, but when the car leaves, Chang Cheng is grabbed by a group of boys. Xiao Guang tells Chang Cheng that Bao Di (played by Fan Riu Xiu) wants to play with him. Xiao Guang tells Chang Cheng to perform oral on Bao Di, who is gagged and restrained by the group of boys. If Chang Cheng does this, then they won't bully Bei Bei anymore. Chang Cheng does what he is told to a resisting Bao Di which is rape, while the one of the boys films it on his phone.

The next day at a school ceremony, Xiao Guang seems disturbed by what is on his phone. He runs out to the field where he is clearly emotional. Chang Cheng brings lunch for him and Bei Bei, but she is not where they were supposed to meet. She ends up being in the bathroom. She was raped again by Xiao Guang. She tells Mr. Wang she wants to stay at school and that what happened is nothing. She doesn't want her grandparents to blame Mr. Wang and that she'll be more careful. Mr. Wang is very upset and walks away. Chang Cheng finds Xiao Guang and beats him up.

Xiao Guang ends up in the hospital, because he cut him wrists. His mother is outside his hospital room and tells Mr. Wang that her son is stressed with studies and that he didn't do the things he was accused of. Mr. Wang tries to ask Xiao Guang what happened, but Xiao Guang will not open up. He continues to say they were just playing. Meanwhile, the video of Chang Cheng and Bao Di and shown to his mom, who tells him to transfer schools at home. Chang Cheng refuses and his mom continues to blame him. Bei Bei sees the video from the window and confronts Bao Di about what happened. Bao Di is clearly upset and says Chang Cheng assaulted him and refuses to go with Bei Bei to explain to the teacher. Bao Di tells Bei Bei that Chang Cheng did it, to make them stop bullying Bei Bei.

Bei Bei goes to a doctor to have a surgery. Chang Cheng and Mr. Wang look for Bei Bei to stop her, but Chang Cheng gets hit by a motorcycle and faints. Mr. Wang finds Bei Bei and the surgery was not completed. The office was not clean and Bei Bei was in a coma due to infections. We learn that the surgery was to prevent Bei Bei from getting pregnant if she were raped again.

Xiao Guang is still in the hospital, where he is visited by someone. Chang Cheng goes on a rampage and he runs to Xiao Guang's hospital room with a hammer, only to find Xiao Guang on the floor cutting his wrists again. The next day, two boys show Chang Cheng a video from the school security camera showing that a teacher, Mr. Weng, was raping and assaulting Xiao Guang since he was a child. Chang Cheng shows the video to Mr. Wang, who confronts the principal. The principal knew all along and continues to try and gaslight Mr. Wang. Mr. Wang talks to Xiao Guang about this, who reveals that he wants to hate Mr. Weng, but he can't. When Mr. Weng visited Xiao Guang in the hospital, Xiao Guang actually touched Mr. Weng. Xiao Guang does not think he deserves to live.

The story of the school is published in the newspaper and the principal gets fired. The kids are on the bus again and it seems fun and light hearted again. But in the back of the bus, Bao Di is glaring at Chang Cheng having fun with classmates. He has a sweater over his lap, and he gets up and sees his classmate asleep. He may be the next Xiao Guang.

References

External links 

 

Taiwanese drama films
2020 thriller drama films
2020s Mandarin-language films
Taiwanese-language films
2020 psychological thriller films
2020 films